Arab studies or Arabic studies is an academic discipline centered on the study of Arabs and Arab World. It consists of several disciplines such as anthropology, sociology, linguistics, historiography, archaeology, cultural studies, economics, geography, international relations, law, literature, philosophy, psychology, political science, and public administration. The field draws from old Arabic chronicles, records and oral literature, in addition to written accounts and traditions about Arabs from explorers and geographers in the Arab World  (Middle East-North Africa).

History
Arab studies talk about the history of the Middle East and North Africa, before the rise of Islam to the present time. Covering a wide range of topics, such as methods, approaches, colonial history, gender, environmental and legal dimensions. It depends on the political, economic, social and cultural history of the region.

Linguistic 

Arabic is a language spoken by more than 422 million people from the ocean to the Gulf, as the Arabs say. This includes Morocco, Mauritania and Western Sahara in the west, and extends to Iraq, the Gulf states and Somalia in the east. The official language of 26 countries, one of the six official languages of the United Nations. It is also the sacred language of over 1.7 billion Muslims around the world, and the language written by some of the greatest works of literature, science and history in the world. According to the teachings of Islam, classical Arabic is the language in which God chose to speak to mankind through Muhammad in the seventh century of the Christian era. It is the language of the Quran, the holy book of Islam. This is the language of Islamic and classical texts. Modern Arabic is the language of books, news broadcasts, poetry and political speeches throughout the Arab world, a language that every child in primary school learns to read and write, a diverse language of Arabic poetic traditions, the precise language of theologians and theologians of the Internet. Knowledge of Arabic provides an opportunity to connect with people throughout the Middle East, providing access to the richness and passion of the contemporary Arab world. Arabic is a way to explore nearly 14 centuries of one of the most sophisticated, diverse, and rich intellectual traditions in the world.

Culture and society 
Culture and society in the Arab world, from structures, institutions, art, poetry, letters, practices, and definitions of identity, based on anthropology, sociology, literature and religious studies.

Development 
Development and political economy in the Arab world, focusing on economic and social development, education, humanitarian aid, and gender and environmental dimensions of development. This concentration is based on economic history, political economy, sociology and politics.

Politics 
Contemporary political developments in the Arab world and the Middle East. The program covers the study of domineering, nationalism, local institutions, politics, war, peacemaking, identity, security policies and environmental security. It relies on comparative policies, international relations, history, science, political economy and development.

Themes

History of Arabs 
 

To understand the history of Arabs provides the indispensable basis to understand all aspects of Arabs and its culture. Themes of special interest are: 
 History of the Arabs
Early Arab conquests

Theology 
 
Kalam is one of the "religious sciences" of Islam. In Arabic, the word means "discussion" and refers to the Arabic tradition of seeking theological principles through dialectic. A scholar of kalam is referred to as a mutakallim.
 Arabic eschatology

Philosophy 
 

Arabic philosophy is a part of Arab studies. It is a longstanding attempt to create harmony between faith, reason or philosophy, and the religious teachings of Arabs. A Muslim engaged in this field is called an Arab philosopher. It is divided in fields like: 
 Early Arabic philosophy
 Avicennism
 Averroism
 Modern Arabic philosophy
 Transcendent theosophy
 List of Arab philosophers
 Illuminationist philosophy

Sciences 

Arabic science is science in the context of traditional ideas of Arabs, including its ethics and prohibitions. An Arab engaged in this field is called a Muslim scientist This is not the same as science as conducted by any Muslim in a secular context.

Literature 
 

 Arabic literature
 Arabic epic literature
 Arabic poetry

Architecture 
Arabic architecture is the entire range of architecture that has evolved within Arab culture in the course of the history of Arabs. Hence the term encompasses religious buildings as well as secular ones, historic as well as modern expressions and the production of all places that have come under the varying levels of Islamic influence.

Art 
 
 Arabic calligraphy
 Arabic pottery
 Arabic music

Notable Arabists 

 William Granara
 George Grigore
 Beatrice Gründler
 Gustave E. von Grunebaum
 Julián Ribera
 Charles Pierre Henri Rieu
 Andrew Rippin
 Maxime Rodinson
 Franz Rosenthal
 Cheryl Rubenberg
 Gordiy Sablukov
 W. Montgomery Watt
 Hans Wehr
 Michael Scott Weir
 Julius Wellhausen
 Abraham Wheelocke
 Franz Woepcke
 William Wright (orientalist)

See also

Center for Contemporary Arab Studies
American Legation, Tangier
Arabic language academies
Centre for the Advanced Study of the Arab World
College of Islamic and Arabic Studies (Dubai)
College of Islamic and Arabic Studies, Afghanistan
Genetic studies on Arabs
Jerusalem Studies in Arabic and Islam
Journal of Arabic and Islamic Studies
Middle East Centre for Arab Studies
Middle East Forum
Middle Eastern studies
Orient-Institut Beirut
Pontifical Institute of Arab and Islamic Studies
School of Arabic Studies
Tribes with Flags

References

 
Middle Eastern studies
Semitic studies